The following is a timeline of the presidency of Donald Trump during the second quarter of 2019, from April 1 to June 30, 2019. To navigate quarters, see timeline of the Donald Trump presidency.

Overview

Public opinion

Timeline

April 2019

May 2019

June 2019

See also
Presidential transition of Donald Trump
First 100 days of Donald Trump's presidency
List of executive actions by Donald Trump
List of presidential trips made by Donald Trump (international trips)

References

2019 Q2
Presidency of Donald Trump
April 2019 events in the United States
May 2019 events in the United States
June 2019 events in the United States
2019 timelines
Political timelines of the 2010s by year